Tabaré Larre Borges Gallarreta (born 6 January 1922, date of death unknown) was an Uruguayan basketball player who competed in the 1952 Summer Olympics. Borges was a member of the Uruguayan team, which won the bronze medal. He played all eight matches.

References

External links

1922 births
Year of death missing
Basketball players at the 1952 Summer Olympics
Olympic basketball players of Uruguay
Olympic bronze medalists for Uruguay
Uruguayan men's basketball players
Uruguayan people of Spanish descent
Sportspeople from Montevideo
Olympic medalists in basketball
Medalists at the 1952 Summer Olympics